The 1978 Big Sky Conference men's basketball tournament was held March 3–4 at Adams Field House at the University of Montana in Missoula, Montana.

Weber State upset top-seeded Montana in the championship game, 62–55 (in overtime), to clinch their first conference tournament title. the first of three consecutive. They had lost in the final in the first two editions. The end of regulation time saw the teams tied at 49 points each; host Montana missed a potential winning free throw with seconds left.

Format
First played in 1976, the Big Sky tournament had the same format for its first eight editions. The regular season champion hosted and only the top four teams from the standings took part, with seeding based on regular season conference records.

Montana made its inaugural appearance, not having qualified as a top-four team in either of the previous two years.

Bracket

NCAA tournament
Weber State received an automatic bid to the 32-team NCAA tournament, but lost in the first round to Arkansas in Eugene, Oregon; Arkansas ultimately advanced to the Final Four.  It was the Wildcats' first NCAA appearance in five years, since they went to six consecutive (1968–1973).

References

Big Sky Conference men's basketball tournament
Tournament
Big Sky Conference men's basketball tournament
Big Sky Conference men's basketball tournament
Basketball competitions in Missoula, Montana
College basketball tournaments in Montana